Frances Toor (1890–1956) was an American author, publisher, anthropologist and ethnographer who wrote mainly about Mexico and Mexican indigenous cultures. She earned a B.A. and an M.A. in anthropology from University of California at Berkeley. She moved to Mexico City in 1922. In 1925, she founded the journal  Mexican Folkways (published until 1937).

References

External links
 Finding Aid for Frances Toor at the Online Archive of California 
 Francis Toor / Por Diego Rivera. International Center for the Arts of the Americas Houston, Digital Archive.

1890 births
1956 deaths
American publishers (people)
American ethnographers
People from Mexico City
20th-century American anthropologists
20th-century American non-fiction writers
University of California, Berkeley alumni
American expatriates in Mexico